Ajax Bay is a settlement on East Falkland, in the Falkland Islands. It is on the north west coast, on the shore of San Carlos Water, a few miles from Port San Carlos. It was mainly a refrigeration plant, and was developed by the Colonial Development Corporation in the 1950s, which was also responsible for developing Port Albemarle. It was supposed to freeze Falkland mutton, but this was found to be economically unviable. Many of the pre-fabricated houses were moved to Stanley.

During the Falklands War, the first British bridgehead was established on San Carlos Water on 21 May 1982. Ajax Bay was one of three landing points, and codenamed "Red Beach" as part of Operation Sutton. The next day, the refrigeration plant became a field hospital, the Advanced Surgical Centre. It was run by Surgeon Commander Rick Jolly and operated until 9 June.

Ajax Bay gallery

References

Populated places on East Falkland
History of the Falkland Islands